Acupalpus exiguus is  a species of ground beetle in the family Carabidae, found in the Palearctic.

References

exiguus
Beetles described in 1829